Kyllikki Naukkarinen (20 March 1925 – 12 February 2011) was a Finnish hurdler. She competed in the women's 80 metres hurdles at the 1948 Summer Olympics.

References

1925 births
2011 deaths
People from Vyborg District
Finnish female hurdlers
Olympic athletes of Finland
Athletes (track and field) at the 1948 Summer Olympics